Kenneth Fleming (26 August 1909 – 14 April 1996) was a South African cricketer. He played in one first-class match for Eastern Province in 1935/36.

See also
 List of Eastern Province representative cricketers

References

External links
 

1909 births
1996 deaths
South African cricketers
Eastern Province cricketers
Sportspeople from Gweru